Pilimathalawa is a suburb of the city of Kandy in Kandy District, Sri Lanka. The town is situated 10 km away from Kandy, the district capital, and 104 km away from Colombo.

"Thalawa" means flat area in Sinhalese, while "Pilima" means statue, however, the real name may or may not have been formed by these words. The ancient village name has been standardized to Pilimathalawa, sometimes spelled as Pilimatalawa. This village is famous for traditional brassware. The Gadaladeniya, Lankathilaka Buddhist temples and the Embekka temple are notable destinations in Pilimathalawa. It is also home to the Theological College of Lanka.

See also
Kandy
Peradeniya

Populated places in Kandy District
Suburbs of Kandy